Greece (GRE) has competed at every celebration of the European Athletics Championships since the 1934 European Athletics Championships in Turin, Italy. As of 2014, Greek athletes have won a total of 34 medals.

Summary

Medalists

See also 
 Greece at the IAAF World Championships in Athletics
Greece at the IAAF World Indoor Championships in Athletics
 Greece at the European Athletics Indoor Championships

References 

 
Nations at the European Athletics Championships
Athletics in Greece